The Buzău is a river in eastern Romania, tributary of the river Siret. Its total length is 302 km, and its drainage basin area is 5,264 km2. Its source is in the south-eastern Carpathian Mountains, east of Brașov. The Buzău flows through the Romanian counties Brașov, Covasna, Buzău and Brăila. It flows into the Siret in Voinești, close to its confluence with the Danube, west of Galați.

The river Buzău gives its name to two urban municipalities: the city of Buzău (the Buzău county seat) and the town of Întorsura Buzăului, in Covasna County. Întorsura Buzăului (which means Buzău's Turning in Romanian) gets its name from being located near a large turn that the river takes. It initially flows northwards, but takes a sudden turn towards the south-east near the town.

Towns and villages

The following towns and villages are situated along the river Buzău, from source to mouth: Vama Buzăului, Întorsura Buzăului, Sita Buzăului, Crasna, Siriu, Nehoiașu, Nehoiu, Păltineni, Pătârlagele, Pănătău, Cislău, Viperești, Măgura, Berca, Săpoca, Vernești, Mărăcineni, Buzău, Săgeata, Găvănești, Banița, Vișani, Câineni-Băi, Grădiștea, Racovița, Latinu.

Tributaries

The following rivers are tributaries of the Buzău (from source to mouth):

Left: Strâmbul, Urlătoarea Mare, Urlătoarea Mică, Dălghiu, Acriș, Lădăuți, Zăbrătău, Harțag, Sasu, Grămăticu,  Tehereu, Ghiurca Mare, Cășoaca Mare, Bâsca, Ciptoraș, Sibiciu, Pănătău, Rușavăț, Bălăneasa, Oleșești, Sărățel, Pâclele (or Murătoarea Pâclei), Slănic, Blăjanca, Valea Largă, Сâlnău, Coștei, Valea Boului, Ghergheasa, Bold

Right: Pârâul Feței, Pârâul Ilcii, Buzăiel, Ciumernic, Chichirău, Crasna, Izvorul Negru, Bradu, Siriul Mare, Bonțu Mare, Nehoiu, Cătiașul Plescari, Valea Rea, Muscel, Bâsca Chiojdului, Nișcov, Buzoel

References

Rivers of Romania
 
Rivers of Brașov County
Rivers of Covasna County
Rivers of Buzău County
Rivers of Brăila County